Katawut Hankampa (Thai คฑาวุธ หาญคำภา), is a Thai futsal goalkeeper, and a member of  Thailand national futsal team. He plays  for Bangkok BTS in Futsal Thailand League.

References

Katawut Hankampa
Living people
Futsal goalkeepers
Katawut Hankampa
1992 births
Katawut Hankampa
Southeast Asian Games medalists in futsal
Competitors at the 2017 Southeast Asian Games